is a 2011 Japanese film. It is directed by director Kohatsu Yo and stars SKE48 members Matsui Jurina and Yagami Kumi, and comedian Itoda Jun.

Plot
Kantaro decides to plan a big event in honor of Shige, the arcade’s chairman and a person who has been running a wooden clog shop for 30 years. However, his true objective is to reconcile Shige and his friend Nobu after they have a fight.

But Kantaro’s little white lie ends up growing, turning his meddlesome plan into a mess.

Cast
 Itoda Jun as Kantaro
 Yazaki Shigeru as Shige, a stubborn old man who is runs a wooden clog shop at the Endouji shopping arcade.
 Matsui Jurina as Sanae, the granddaughter of Shige.
 Yagami Kumi as a high school student
 Lou Oshiba as Nobu, Shige's friend. They previously had a fight and became estranged.
 Ozawa Kazuhiro
 Mizuno Miki
 Fujita Tomoko
 Moro Morooka
 Miwa Mizuki
 Kojima Noriko
 Matthew Lott as Peter, an immigrant who works at a bakery in the Endouji shopping arcade.

Production
Waya! Uchuu Ichi no Osekkai Daisakusen was first announced on 26 July 2011. It will be directed by the director Kohatsu Yo, who previously directed the film Chikujo seyo!.

Director Kohatsu Yo held an audition for all 57 SKE48 members at their theater in Nagoya. In the end, members Matsui Jurina and Yagami Kumi were selected for roles in this film. This will be the first time that either of them will star in a film. Matsui Jurina will star as the granddaughter of Shige. At the time of the filming, Matsui was only 13 years old, even though her character in the film is 18 years old. Yagami Kumi will also play the role of a character 2–3 years older than her. She remarked that "the feeling of playing the role of an elder sister to Matsui Jurina is a little strange".

Release
Waya! Uchuu Ichi no Osekkai Daisakusen will first be released in Nagoya cinemas on 29 October 2011. It will then be released at a later date in other parts of Japan.

See also
 SKE48

References

External links
  
 

Japanese comedy films
2011 films